Delaney Athletic Conference consisted of 15 high schools from Northern and Central Virginia.  The Delaney Athletic Conference (DAC) is named after Joe Delaney, a former athlete from Northwestern State University.  The conference disbanded following the 2020-2021 school year.

Mission statement
"The Delaney Athletic Conference was created by its member schools in a spirit of trust and shared commitment to the highest ideal of sportsmanship, healthy competition, and mutual respect."

Members
Chelsea Academy
Foxcroft School
Fredericksburg Academy 
Fredericksburg Christian School
Highland School
Quantico High School
Randolph-Macon Academy
Seton High School
Tandem Friends School
Trinity Christian School
Wakefield Country Day School
Wakefield School 
Saint Michael the Archangel High School

References

High school sports conferences and leagues in the United States